The rock carvings at Eidefoss by the river Fossen in Nord-Fron municipality in Oppland county in Norway, comprise two images of moose. These are on a rock, possibly fallen from a west-facing, nearly vertical cliff, about 20 meters from the river. One measures 31 cm and the other 35 cm.

The location of the site is south of the white water where the river broadens to the east. During normal water level the rock is well away from the river.

See also
Pre-historic art
Petroglyph
History of Norway
List of World Heritage Sites in Europe
Rock carvings in Norway

External links
 Rock art at Directorate for Cultural Heritage — in Norwegian (there are also english pages)

Eidefoss
Culture in Oppland